Ebüzziya Mehmed Tevfik (1849 – 1913) was an Ottoman educator, intellectual and writer, whose ideas contributed to the formation of the Turkish national identity during the early decades of the Turkish Republic.

References 

1849 births
1913 deaths
Writers from Istanbul
19th-century writers from the Ottoman Empire
Committee of Union and Progress politicians